Guanylate cyclase soluble subunit alpha-2 is an enzyme that in humans is encoded by the GUCY1A2 gene.

References

Further reading

EC 4.6.1